Skopo is a village in the Municipality of Sežana in the Littoral region of Slovenia.

The parish church in the settlement is dedicated to Saint Michael and belongs to the Diocese of Koper.

References

External links
Skopo on Geopedia

Populated places in the Municipality of Sežana